Robert Paul "Bo" Cornell (born March 7, 1949 in Seattle, Washington) is a former American football linebacker and running back who played seven seasons in the National Football League with the Cleveland Browns and Buffalo Bills. He played collegiately for the University of Washington.

1949 births
Living people
American football linebackers
Cleveland Browns players
Buffalo Bills players
Washington Huskies football players
Players of American football from Seattle
American football running backs